Pereyomnaya is a rural locality (a settlement) in Kabansky District, Republic of Buryatia, Russia. The population was 89 as of 2010. There are 4 streets.

Geography 
Pereyomnaya is located 118 km southwest of Kabansk (the district's administrative centre) by road. Osinovka is the nearest rural locality.

References 

Rural localities in Kabansky District
Populated places on Lake Baikal